Frazier Park may refer to:

 Frazier Park, California, an unincorporated village in Kern County, California
 Frazier Park (Charlotte, North Carolina), an urban park in Charlotte, North Carolina